Lunda Norte is a province of Angola. It has an area of 103,760 km² and a population of 862,566. Angola's first President, Agostino Neto, made Lucapa the provincial capital after independence, but the capital was later moved to Dundo. The province borders the Democratic Republic of Congo in the northeast and Lunda Sul in the south. The province is rich in gold and diamonds, but remains vastly underdeveloped and impoverished. UNITA used the money generated from the sale of diamonds to fund war efforts. Cuango River valley, the richest diamond area of Angola is located in the province. Mining is done by notable companies like DeBeers and Endiama. The Lunda province whose capital was Saurimo was created by the Portuguese colonial empire on July 13, 1895. It was divided into Lunda-Sul and Lunda-Norte subdivisions through a constitution act in 1978 by the People's Movement for the Liberation of Angola (MPLA) government. Iron and manganese mining are also important economic activities. It is well known for its sculptures. The most notable one is The Thinker (O Pensador), a sculpture of a man holding his head. It is rich in terms of flora and fauna.

Lunda Norte is populated by Chokwe, Lunda, and other ethnical groups. Ernesto Muangala is the current governor of the province. Lino dos Santos, Deolinda Odia Paulo Satula Vilarinho and Ângêlica Nené Curita Ihungo are the deputy governors for Technical and Infrastructure Services, Economic Sector Area and Political and Social Sector Area respectively. An ethnographic museum located in the province is visited by many tourists. During the Angolan Civil War (1975-2002) many civilians were killed in the clashes between National Union for the Total Independence of Angola (UNITA) and Angolan Armed Forces (FAA). Diamond mining operations were also affected. Many landmines laid during the civil war are still present in the province. Leprosy and Elephantiasis are major disease which affect the province.

Municipalities
The province of Lunda Norte contains ten municipalities:

 Capenda-Camulemba (Capemba-Camulemba)
 Cambulo (Caumbo)
 Caungula
 Chitato (Tchitato)
 Cuango
 Cuilo
 Lóvua
 Lubalo
 Lucapa
 Shah-Muteba

Communes
The province of Lunda Norte contains the following communes; sorted by their respective municipalities:

 Capemba-Camulemba Municipality: – Capenda-Camulemba, Xinge
 Cambulo Municipality: – Cachimo, Cambulo, Canzar, Luia
 Caungula Municipality: – Camaxilo, Caungula
 Chitato Municipality: – Dundo-Chitato, Luachimo
 Cuango Municipality: – Cuango, Luremo
 Cuilo Municipality: – Caluango, Cuilo
 Lóvua Municipality: – Lóvua
 Lubalo Municipality: – Luangue, Lubalo, Muvulege (Muvuluege)
 Lucapa Municipality: – Camissombo, Capaia, Lucapa, Xa–Cassau (Shah-Cassau)
 Xá-Muteba Municipality: –  Cassanje-Calucala, Iongo, Xá-Muteba (Shah-Muteba)

List of governors of Lunda Norte

References

Citations

Bibliography

External links 
 Information on this province at Info Angola
 Province geographical info at geoview.info

 
Provinces of Angola